Estádio do Clube Ferroviário da Huíla is a multi-use stadium in Lubango, Angola.  It is currently used mostly for football matches and is owned by Clube Ferroviário da Huíla.  The stadium holds 30,000 people.

References

Football venues in Angola
Buildings and structures in Lubango